Wakelin is a surname.  Notable people with this surname include:

 Barry Wakelin (born 1946), Australian politician
 Cara Wakelin (born 1977), Canadian model and actress
 Chris Wakelin (born 1992), English snooker player
 Darryl Wakelin (born 1974), former Australian rules footballer
 David Lawley Wakelin, documentarist
 Edwin Wakelin (1880-1925), English cricketer
 James H. Wakelin, Jr. (1911–1990) government official
 Johnny Wakelin (born 1939), British Pye Records recording artist
 Mary A. Hitchcock Wakelin (1834-1900), American temperance reformer
 Roland Wakelin (1887–1971), Australian painter
 Shane Wakelin (born 1974), former Australian rules footballer
 Simon Wakelin, photojournalist

See also
 Wakelin v London & South Western Railway Co., 1886 lawsuit